Tagliafico is an Italian surname. Notable people with the surname include:

Nicolás Tagliafico (born 1992), Argentine footballer
Santo Tagliafico (1756–1829), Italian painter

Italian-language surnames